Stephen Aloysius Neary (1925–1996) is a former politician and cabinet minister in Newfoundland and Labrador, Canada.

Neary worked at the Argentia Naval Base until 1945 before moving to a job at the Dominion Steel Company on Bell Island. He helped unionize the office employees at the company and then served on the municipal council.

He was active with the Newfoundland Federation of Labour serving as its secretary-treasurer and ran for office as a candidate for the Newfoundland Democratic Party in the 1959 provincial election

In 1962, he was elected to the Newfoundland House of Assembly as a Liberal and, as a backbench MHA, took on the legal industry for charging excessive fees and sparked a Royal Commission of Inquiry into the matter. In 1968 he was appointed to cabinet and was Minister of Public Services from 1969 to 1972 when the government was defeated. After losing the Liberal nomination for his riding in 1975 he ran, and was elected as an Independent Liberal. Rejoining the party, he ran unsuccessfully for leader in 1977. He was appointed Leader of the Opposition on May 3, 1982 after party leader Len Stirling failed to win a seat in the 1982 provincial election and also served as interim party leader from 1983 to 1984. He retired from provincial politics in 1985. He attempted to win a seat in the House of Commons of Canada in a St. John's East federal by-election in 1987 but was defeated.

After his retirement he wrote a book about the German U-boat attack on Bell Island in the second World War, called Enemy on our Doorstep. He also devoted a great deal of time to Bell Island and was instrumental in raising monuments, and to creating a museum.

References

1925 births
1996 deaths
Members of the Executive Council of Newfoundland and Labrador
Liberal Party of Newfoundland and Labrador MHAs
Liberal Party of Canada candidates for the Canadian House of Commons
Newfoundland and Labrador political party leaders